Mellis is a village in Suffolk, England.

Mellis may also refer to:

Mellis (surname)
Sir Mellis Napier (1882–1976), Australian judge and academic administrator

See also
Melis, a surname and given name
Melli (disambiguation)
Mellish, a surname